Ruy Castro (born 26 February 1948, in Caratinga) is a Brazilian author and journalist. In 1996 he was a co-winner of the Prêmio Jabuti. He is known for his writings concerning Bossa nova and for his biographies, profiling  figures such as Garrincha, Nelson Rodrigues and Carmen Miranda.

On 6 October 2022 he was elected to occupy the Chair number 13 at the Brazilian Academy of Letters, in succession to Sérgio Paulo Rouanet.

Published works 
 Chega de Saudade: A história e as histórias da Bossa Nova - 1990;
 O Anjo Pornográfico: A vida de Nelson Rodrigues - 1992;
 Saudades do Século XX - 1994;
 Estrela Solitária - Um Brasileiro Chamado Garrincha - 1995 (prêmio Jabuti in 1996);
 Ela é Carioca - 1999;
 Bilac Vê Estrelas - 2000;
 O Pai que era Mãe - 2001;
 A Onda que se Ergueu no Mar - 2001;
 Carnaval no Fogo - 2003;
 Flamengo: O Vermelho e o Negro - 2004;
 Amestrando Orgasmos - 2004;
 Carmen - Uma Biografia - 2005 (prêmio Jabuti in 2006);
 Rio Bossa Nova - 2006;
 Tempestade de Ritmos - 2007;
 Era no tempo do rei: Um romance da chegada da corte - 2007;
 Terramarear (co-authored with Heloísa Seixas) - 2011;
 Morrer de Prazer - Crônicas da Vida por um Fio - 2013;
 Letra e música - 2013
 A noite do meu bem - a história e as histórias do Samba-Canção - 2015

Adaptations and anthologies 
 Mau-Humor: Uma antologia definitiva de citações venenosas;
 Contos de Estimação;
 Querido Poeta: Correspondência de Vinicius de Moraes.

References  

People from Minas Gerais
Brazilian journalists
Male journalists
1948 births
Brazilian columnists
Living people
Brazilian biographers
Brazilian translators
20th-century Brazilian novelists
20th-century Brazilian male writers
Brazilian male novelists
21st-century Brazilian novelists
21st-century Brazilian male writers
Male biographers